Germarostes globosus is a species of pill scarab beetle in the family Hybosoridae. It is found in North America.

References

Further reading

 

scarabaeiformia
Articles created by Qbugbot
Beetles described in 1835